Robert Otis De Vestel (January 5, 1925 - September 30, 1997) was an American set decorator. He was nominated for two Academy Awards in the category Best Art Direction. De Vestel died on September 30, 1997, at the age of 72.

Selected filmography
De Vestel was nominated for two Academy Awards for Best Art Direction:
 Tom Sawyer (1973) 
 Logan's Run (1976)

References

External links

American set decorators
1925 births
1997 deaths